From a Window is an album by American keyboardist and composer Wayne Horvitz's Four Plus One Ensemble recorded in 2000 and released on the Japanese Avant label.

Reception
The Allmusic review by Michael G. Nastos awarded the album 4 stars stating "This style of thoroughly modern music teeters on a nostalgic, rustic, days-gone-by feeling, as reflected by the men's bowery and women's club black-and-white cover photos. The intriguing music world of Horvitz exists as both cultures somehow meet on an imaginary plane, and it's in a universe well worth entering".

Track listing
All compositions by Wayne Horvitz
 "Crispin And Lisa's Duet" - 5:15   
 "Sweeter Than the Day" - 5:36   
 "Julian's Ballad" - 5:23   
 "People Just Float" - 6:29   
 "Leave Here Now" - 10:11   
 "From a Window" - 8:35   
 "Willy's Music" - 8:08  
Recorded at Litho Studio in Seattle, Washington in August 2000

Personnel
Wayne Horvitz - piano, prepared piano, Hammond B-3 organ, pump organ, synthesizers, toy piano
Eyvind Kang - violin, viola
Tucker Martine - live electronic processing, live drum machine
Julian Priester - trombone
Reggie Watts - keyboards, vocals, live drum machine, piano
Skerik - baritone saxophone

References

Avant Records albums
Wayne Horvitz albums
2001 albums